Glenn Hills Comprehensive High School is a public high school located in the 
south Augusta area of Augusta, Georgia, United States. It opened in 1967.

Athletics
The school mascot is a Spartan, and the school colors are Columbia blue and silver.

See also

Richmond County School System

References

External links
Glenn Hills High School

Glenn Hills High School
Public high schools in Georgia (U.S. state)